Wang Peisheng (1919–2004) was a teacher of Wu-style t'ai chi ch'uan. He was Yang Yuting's student and also a student of Wang Mao Zhai.

Biography
He began training in martial arts with the Baguazhang master Ma Gui learning Yin Style Ba Gua Zhang 64 Palms. He assisted Yang Yu Ting teaching t'ai chi from the age of 15. He became the head of the Northern Wu-style t'ai chi ch'uan group in Beijing after the death of Yang Yu Ting in 1982.

Although most famous for his taijiquan he began his long career by studying Yin baguazhang with 3rd generation master Ma Gui. He was also very skilled in tongbeiquan, tantui, xingyiquan, and bajiquan, having studied with famous masters of each of these arts.

He was noted for his expertise in the self-defence methods of Wu-style t'ai chi. In the 1950s he developed a shortened 37 posture Wu-style form presented in his book 'Wu Style Chi Chuan' (Zhaohua Publishing House, Beijing, 1983).

Wu-style was created by a Manchurian named Wu Ch'uan-yu (1834–1902). Wu was a student of Yang Luchan, (founder of the Yang style), and Yang Pan-hou.

T'ai chi ch'uan lineage tree with Wu-style focus

References

Chinese tai chi practitioners
1919 births
2004 deaths
Chinese baguazhang practitioners